Jocelin "Joe" Clermond, Jr. (born November 13, 1984) is a former American Football defensive end. He was signed by the Chicago Bears as an undrafted free agent in 2008. He played college football at Pittsburgh.

Early years
Joseph Clermond was All-Tampa Tribune Hillsborough County, All-Western Conference American Division after being a two-year starter and three-year letterman for Chamberlain High School. He started at linebacker, strong safety and H-back and compiled 101 tackles and six interceptions as a senior. In his junior year Joseph Clermond intercepted seven passes, returning three for touchdowns. He helped his team to Florida 5A playoffs each of his three varsity seasons, including the 2001 state finals.

College career
Clermond played in 46 games, including 25 starts at DE during his career and was credited with 142 tackles (82 solo), 17.5 sacks, 36.5 TFLs and 4 FR in his Pitt career. In 2007 Clermond made 53 tackles (13 for losses) and 10.5 sacks and forced two fumbles and blocked a kick and was named Second-team All-Big East for the second consecutive season. At Pitt, in 2006, he was selected Second-team All-Big East after starting all 12 games at defensive end and had 48 tackles and 16.5 TFLs and 5.5 sacks and two fumble recoveries. He contributed as a reserve defensive end, playing in 10 games and had 14 tackles, five TFLs and two sacks on the year in 2005. In 2004, he played in all 12 games in his first active season and made 27 tackles, two TFLs and one fumble recovery. He redshirted as a true freshman in 2003.

Professional career

Pre-draft

Chicago Bears
Clermond was signed by the Chicago Bears as an undrafted free agent in 2008. He was waived on September 4, 2009. He was re-signed to the practice squad later in the season, only to be released on December 1, 2009.

Virginia Destroyers
Clermond was signed by the Virginia Destroyers of the United Football League on June 28, 2011.

References

External links
Just Sports Stats
Chicago Bears bio
Pittsburgh Panthers bio

George D. Chamberlain High School alumni
1984 births
American football defensive ends
Chicago Bears players
Chicago Rush players
Florida Tuskers players
Living people
Pittsburgh Panthers football players
Players of American football from Tampa, Florida
Virginia Destroyers players